Raymond Impanis (19 October 1925 – 31 December 2010) was a Belgian professional cyclist from 1947 to 1963. He won Paris–Roubaix, the Tour of Flanders, Gent–Wevelgem and three stages in Tour de France. He has been made an honorary citizen of the town of Kampenhout.

Impanis died on 31 December 2010, aged 85, following a long illness.

Major results

1947
Tour de France:
Winner stage 19
6th place overall classification
Berg-Housse-Berg

1948
Kampenhout — Charleroi — Kampenhout
Omloop der Vlaamse Ardennen Ichtegem
Tour de France:
Winner stages 9 and 10
10th place overall classification

1949
Berg-Housse-Berg
Dwars door Vlaanderen

1950
Steenokkerzeel
Weekend Ardennais
Berg-Housse-Berg
Tour de France:
8th place overall classification

1951
Dwars door Vlaanderen
Kortenberg

1952
Ronde van Haspengouw
Gent–Wevelgem

1953
Gent–Wevelgem

1954
Paris–Roubaix
Tour of Flanders
Paris–Nice

1955
Boortmeerbeek
Hanret
Huy
La Hulpe

1956
Namur
Vuelta a España:
3rd place overall classification

1957
La Flèche Wallonne
GP Stan Ockers
Jadotville
Knokke
Giro d'Italia:
7th place overall classification

1958
Braine-le-Comte

1959
Londerzeel

1960
Paris–Nice

References

External links

Official Tour de France results for Raymond Impanis

1925 births
2010 deaths
Belgian male cyclists
Belgian Tour de France stage winners
Cyclists from Flemish Brabant
People from Kampenhout